Waithood (a portmanteau of "wait" and "adulthood") is a period of stagnation in the lives of young unemployed college graduates in various industrializing and developing nations or regions, primarily in the Middle East, North Africa (MENA) and India, where their expertise is still not widely needed or applicable. "Waithood" is described as "a kind of prolonged adolescence", and "the bewildering time in which large proportions of youth spend their best years waiting". It is a phase in which the difficulties youth face in each of these interrelated spheres of life result in a debilitating state of helplessness and dependency. One commentator argues that waithood can be best understood by examining outcomes and linkages across five different sectors: education, employment, housing, credit, and marriage.

The neologism was coined in 2007 by political scientist Diane Singerman.  

Waithood is applicable only to college educated people who are not compelled to settle in blue collar jobs due to support from family elders or resources. Due to the lack of any potential employment, waithood is also tangentially related to rising rate of belated parenthood in various developing countries, with younger people choosing or being forced to delay starting their own families, which was uncommon in the modern industrialized countries when they were developing.

References

External links 

Fountain of Youth, Gulf News, January 2008
Young and Out of Work in the Middle East, ABC News, December 2007
Mohamed Ali: The link between unemployment and terrorism, TED talk November 2013

Unemployment
Economy of the Middle East
North African culture
Neologisms
2007 neologisms